Daniel Howard Simpson (born July 9, 1939 in Wheeling, West Virginia) is an American former Foreign Service Officer. He was the United States Ambassador to the Central African Republic  (1990–92), Special Envoy to Somalia and the United States Ambassador to the Democratic Republic of the Congo (1995–98) as well as undertaking other  overseas assignments in Burundi, South Africa, Zaire (on three separate occasions) Iceland, Lebanon and Bosnia-Herzegovina. He also served as the Deputy Commandant of the United States Army War College and on the Board of directors as the Vice President of the National Defense University for the United States Institute of Peace.

Before joining the United States Foreign Service and becoming a diplomat in 1966, Simpson studied English literature at Yale University and African studies at Northwestern University, before travelling Africa to teach at the Eghosa Anglican Boys’ School in Benin City, Nigeria, and at the Libyan Army Military College in Benghazi, Libya.

After retirement from the Department of State in 2001, Simpson has been a writer and columnist for the Pittsburgh Post-Gazette and The Blade as well as a member of the American Academy of Diplomacy.

References

External links

 

1939 births
Living people
People from Wheeling, West Virginia
Ambassadors of the United States to Kenya
Ambassadors of the United States to the Central African Republic
Ambassadors of the United States to the Democratic Republic of the Congo
United States Foreign Service personnel
20th-century American diplomats